Stephen Ettinger (born April 28, 1989) is an American cyclist. Specializing in mountain biking, Ettinger competed at the Pan American Games in 2015, and won the bronze medal in the cross-country event. Ettinger has won multiple US Mountain Bike National Championships, including the 2011 U23 Cross-Country National Championship (Ketchum, ID), 2013 Professional Men's Cross-Country National Championship (Bear Mountain, PA), and 2014 Professional Men's Short-Track Cross-Country National Championship (Bear Mountain, PA). He was both the Cross-Country MTB and Short-Track Cross-Country MTB Collegiate National Champion in 2010, representing Montana State University. He was the 2014 UCI Pan-American MTB Champion (Barbacena, Brazil).

References

External links
 

1989 births
Living people
American male cyclists
American mountain bikers
Pan American Games medalists in cycling
Pan American Games bronze medalists for the United States
Cyclists at the 2015 Pan American Games
Medalists at the 2015 Pan American Games